James Napier (born 18 September 1984), known professionally as Jimmy Napes, is an English songwriter and record producer. He has won a number of awards, including an Academy Award, a Golden Globe Award, 3 Grammy Awards, and 2 Ivor Novello Awards. Napes is best known for his work with Sam Smith ("Stay with Me", "Writing's on the Wall", "Lay Me Down", "Too Good at Goodbyes", "Dancing with a Stranger"), Disclosure ("Latch", "You & Me", "White Noise", "Magnets"), Clean Bandit ("Rather Be")‚ Stormzy ("Crown") and Taylor Swift ("Christmas Tree Farm"). Napes also has songwriting and producer credits with artists including Alicia Keys, Jess Glynne, Khalid, Normani, Kano, Dave, Rita Ora, Ellie Goulding, Mary J. Blige, Madonna, James Bay and more.

Life
The son of John Napier, a British theatre designer, and Donna King, an American dancer and actress, Napes grew up in England.

In 2010, he worked with Eliza Doolittle on her album of the same name. Since then, he has written for (and co-written with) several other artists, including Disclosure, Sam Smith, Clean Bandit and Mary J. Blige. In 2015, he earned a Grammy Award for Song of the Year for his work on Smith's "Stay with Me", co-written with Smith and Tourist. In the same year, Napes also won the Ivor Novello Award for Best Contemporary Song for co-writing Clean Bandit's  "Rather Be".

Napes released his debut EP as a singer, The Making of Me, on Method Records in March 2015. For co-writing "Writing's on the Wall" with Sam Smith, Napes won the Golden Globe Award and the Academy Award for Best Original Song.

Napes has a son, born in 2015. Sam Smith is a godparent to Napes' son.

Discography

Extended plays
The Making of Me (2015)

Songwriting and production credits

References

1984 births
Living people
21st-century English musicians
English house musicians
English male singers
English pop singers
English record producers
British contemporary R&B singers
English songwriters
Golden Globe Award-winning musicians
Grammy Award winners
Musicians from London
Best Original Song Academy Award-winning songwriters
21st-century British male musicians
British male songwriters